Wuyishan City is a county-level city in the municipal region of Nanping, in the northwest of Fujian, People's Republic of China, which borders Jiangxi to the northwest. It corresponds to the former Chong'an County.

Natural and cultural heritage
A local subsection of the Wuyishan Mountain range, which forms the entirety of the geological and political divide between the provinces of Fujian and Jiangxi, is a front-rank national park called simply Wuyi Mountains. Since 1999 the park zone has been recognised by UNESCO as part of the world's natural and cultural heritage.

Cultural sites within the zone include the original cultivation ground of the Da Hong Pao tea variety, and a villa retreat used by Zhu Xi, a Confucian revivalist scholar-official of the rump or Southern Song Empire.

South of the zone, just short of the City's border with Jianyang District, is a major archaeological excavation of the vanished State of Yue.

Not far from Wuyishan, the Jiyufang Laolong kiln, located in a village near the town of Shuiji, has been able to restart production of Jian ware using original clay.

Administration
The city executive, legislature and judiciary are in Chong'an Subdistrict, together with the CPC and PSB branches.

There are two other subdistricts: 
 Xinfeng – formerly Chengdong Township
 Wuyi – formerly Wuyi Town

Towns
 Xingcun – embarkation for raft tours down the Jiuqu Brook
 Xingtian 　
 Wufu

Townships
 Shangmei 　
 Wutun
 Langu
 Yangzhuang

Climate

Transportation

The Wuyishan Airport serves the Wuyishan area.  The Hengfeng–Nanping Railway and Hefei–Fuzhou High-Speed Railway pass through Wuyishan.

Specialty 
 Langu Smoked Goose
 Paddy Carp
 Ching Ming Fruit
 Gui Jie (: transliteration)

Sister cities 

 Honolulu, Hawaii, U.S.A. 12 Jul., 2005
 Blue Mountains, New South Wales, Australia 30 Jun., 2009

See also
 Wuyi New Area

References

Cities in Fujian
County-level divisions of Fujian
Nanping